Zebrie Sanders (born December 4, 1989) is a former American football offensive tackle. He played college football for the Florida State Seminoles. He was drafted by the Buffalo Bills in the fifth round of the 2012 NFL Draft. He was considered one of the best offensive tackle prospects for the 2012 NFL Draft.

College career 
Sanders was a starter for the Seminoles since beginning in his freshman year and started 37 games prior to his senior year.

Professional career
Sanders was selected by the Buffalo Bills in the fifth round (144th overall) in the 2012 NFL Draft. He spent his entire rookie season on IR due to an hip injury. He was released by the Bills on August 31, 2013.

References

External links 
 
 Buffalo Bills bio
 Florida State Seminoles bio

1989 births
Living people
American football offensive tackles
American players of Canadian football
Buffalo Bills players
Calgary Stampeders players
Canadian football offensive linemen
Florida State Seminoles football players
Winnipeg Blue Bombers players
Players of American football from Dayton, Ohio
Players of Canadian football from Dayton, Ohio